Bakhshapur is a big town of district Kashmore, Sindh, Pakistan. Land of Domki(Baloch) tribe dwelling here.

The name Bakhshapur is kept after the late Nawab Bakhsha Khan Domki the father of Nawab Shah Ali Khan and grand father of Nawab Khan Saheb Ali Bilawal Khan Domki who was the chieftain of the Giloee tribe. Bakshapur is a feudal territory basically owned by the Domki tribe.The biggest village in town is village Jan Muhammad Domki/Muhkam Din Domki whose family owns the major land in Bakhshapur Town. There are other major villages around Bakhshapur such as village Khan Saheb Ali Bilawal Khan, village Khalid Khan, Haleem shahar (Haleem jo goth), Kawraee, various villages of Shahi Paar, Gundair, Maanghar Village of Mir Bakhsha Khan Domki are also owned by the Domki family legacy of Nawab Bakhsha Khan. The Giloee clan of the Domki tribe has control over Bakhshapur and its surrounding villages as late Nawab Bakhsha Khan Dombki was the chief of the whole Giloee clan which included other sub clans such as Kamalani, Jamalani, Fazalwani, Phulwani, Bedani, Wazeerani and Narukhani etc. The family of Nawab Bakhsha Khan Dombki who are Narukhanis of Giloee clan of the Dombki tribe now itself has become a huge tribe. Its geographical coordinates are 28° 22' 35" North, 69° 21' 50" East.

The majority of Domki tribe is in Bakhshapur and its surrounding major villages. Other baloch and non Baloch tribes also prevail there plus a great number of Hindu population lives in the main town of Bakhshapur. The Hindu population is basically business oriented and have been living here through ancestral times. Other Major  tribes include THAHEEM, Channa, Taanwari, Chijan, Soomro, Dahar, Chachar, Khaalti, Kumbhaar etc.

External links 
 Maplandia: Bakhshapur
 Indexmundi: Bakhshapur

Populated places in Kashmore District